Sajjan Raj Vaidya is a Nepalese singer, songwriter, guitarist, composer, and producer based in New York City. He released his debut single, "Aaja Matra", in 2014 and rose to prominence after the release of his singles "Hawaijahaj" (2016) and "Chitthi Bhitra" (2018). One of his most widely known singles is "Hataarindai, Bataasindai". His release, titled "BLYHL", was released in February 2020. His song, "Phutki Janey Jovan" released on 16 May 2020 shows various clips of people during the COVID-19 pandemic all around the world, with a special emphasis on Nepali people.
He then released "Lukaamaari" on January 1, 2021. After 3 months of "Lukaamaari", he released his next song, "Ultaa Paailaa". He also released the songs "Parkhaai" and "Naganya Maya" by the while, he released his two new singles "Sasto Mutu" and "Ek Sarvanaam" at the beginning of 2022.

Early life 
Sajjan Raj Vaidya was born on September 10, 1993, and raised in Kathmandu, Nepal. He was introduced to music by his family and credited his style, influences, and musical development to his family: “My story with music began with my family. My mother taught me how to sing, my father taught us to listen to music in all its forms and my brother taught me to evolve with music. So any style or influence I have is constituted by parts of what I learned from my family. My continuity in music comes from my sheer love for it.”

Vaidya's early influences include various genres with artists such as The Eagles, UB40, Linkin Park and Karna Das among others. He started performing live during his school days and later began publishing his work through Facebook.

Career 
Vaidya's first major release was "Aaja Matra" (2014). His next single, "Hawaijahaj" (2016) was a breakthrough. The music video for the song was produced by Fuzz Factory Productions. He later (re)released "Mooskaan" (2018) and "Anountho Mutu" (2018). On 1 January 2019, Sajjan released a single titled "Hataarindai, Bataasindai". The screenplay features a straight couple and a gay couple, and the video depicts a gay couple kissing, which is uncommon in Nepali media. Vaidya is one of the very few Nepali artists to represent the LGBTQ community through the video's release.

"When I wrote Hataarindai, Bataasindai, it was independent of the video concept. We decided that the underrepresentation of the LGBTQ community in Nepal was an important issue that needed to be addressed and that is how the video came about." The 2019's single has been adopted by the LGBTQ community of Nepal as an anthem, featuring the song during the first pride parade of Nepal that took place in July 2019.

Katha 
Katha is a video series started by Vaidya in 2018. The series debuted in the artist's YouTube channel. The video series features a live, acoustic rendition of a song published by the artist or other artists, and also includes a section discussing the origin and the composition process of the song.

Episodes 
 I: Nothing In My Head Besides Timi
 II: Mellow
 III: Marijau (featuring Bikki Gurung)
 IV: Purva Jaaney Panchi (featuring Joyous Gurung)
 V: Alapatra (featuring Yabesh Thapa)

Discography

Singles 
"Aaja Matra" (2014)
"Hawaijahaj" (2016)
"Mayaloo" (2017)
"Chitthi Bhitra" (2018)
"Anountho Mutu" (2014, re-release: 2018)
"Mooskaan" (2014, re-release: 2018)
Nothing In My Head Besides Timi (2018)
"Hataarindai, Bataasindai" (2019)
 "Pahaar" (2019)
"Kurakaani" (2019)
"Somebody Else" (2020)
"Sukumbaasi" (2020)
"BLYHL" (2020)
"Phutki Jaaney Jovan" (2020)
"Lukaamaari" (2021)
"Ultaa Paailaa" (2021)
"Parkhaai" (2021)
"Naganya Maya" (2021)
"Sasto Mutu" (2022)
"Ek Sarvanaam" (2022)
"Dhairya" (2022)
"Hyatteri" (2023)

Recognition 
 Best New Artist (2018) 
Artist of the Month (March 2019)

References

External links 
 
Official YouTube Channel
Official Instagram Account

21st-century Nepalese male singers
 Living people
 Indie pop musicians
 Musicians from Kathmandu
 Nepalese singer-songwriters
1991 births